Südliche Altmark was a Verwaltungsgemeinschaft ("collective municipality") in the Altmarkkreis Salzwedel (district), in Saxony-Anhalt, Germany. It was situated around Gardelegen, which was the seat of the Verwaltungsgemeinschaft, but not part of it. It was disbanded in January 2011.

The Verwaltungsgemeinschaft Südliche Altmark consisted of the following municipalities:

Former Verwaltungsgemeinschaften in Saxony-Anhalt